Cold as Ice (1992) is a science fiction novel by Charles Sheffield. The setting takes place in the late 21st century with humans having colonized the Solar System, and a terrible civil war recently resolved in which 50% of humanity was wiped out. The plot follows an eclectic group of characters sorting out a mystery initiated during the early days of the war. Like most of Sheffield's books, in addition to hard scifi descriptions of a convincing future world, intricate psychologies of the major characters play a crucial role.

Cold as Ice has been through six editions and remains in print more than twenty years after initial publication.

References

1992 American novels
Novels by Charles Sheffield
1992 science fiction novels
Fiction about the Solar System
Hard science fiction

Post-apocalyptic novels
Fiction about outer space